Paul Puk Kun Pal (born 12 February 2000) is a South Sudanese footballer who plays as a centre-back for K3 League club Ulsan Citizen.

Club career
Pal began his career at South Sudanese club Munuki. In June 2019, he joined compatriot Martin Sawi at South Korean club Goyang Citizen. Ahead of the 2020 K3 League, Pal joined Sawi at Yangju Citizen.

International career
In November 2018, Pal represented South Sudan's under-23 team against Uganda. On 17 November 2019, Pal made his debut for South Sudan in a 2–1 loss against Burkina Faso.

References

External links
 

2000 births
Living people
South Sudanese footballers
South Sudan international footballers
Association football defenders
South Sudanese expatriate footballers
South Sudanese expatriate sportspeople in South Korea
Expatriate footballers in South Korea
K3 League players